The 1925–26 Ljubljana Subassociation League was the seventh season of the Ljubljana Subassociation League. Ilirija won the league for the seventh season in a row, defeating Rapid in the final.

Celje subdivision

Ljubljana subdivision

Maribor subdivision

Semi-final

Final

References

External links
Football Association of Slovenia 

Slovenian Republic Football League seasons
Yugo
2
Football
Football